Peter Lee Ki-heon (born December 31, 1947) is a Korean prelate of the Roman Catholic Church. He served as head of the Military Ordinariate of Korea from 1988 to 2000. He is the second and current Bishop of Uijeongbu, having been appointed by Pope Benedict XVI in 2010.

References

1947 births
Living people
South Korean Roman Catholic bishops
Korean military chaplains
People from Pyongyang